Union Township is a township in Sedgwick County, Kansas, United States. As of the 2000 United States Census, it had a population of 2,156.

References

Townships in Sedgwick County, Kansas
Townships in Kansas